Aljaž Bedene took the title, beating Diego Schwartzman 6–3, 6–4

Seeds

Draw

Finals

Top half

Bottom half

References
 Main Draw
 Qualifying Draw

Banja Luka Challenger - Singles
2013 Singles
2013 in Bosnia and Herzegovina